Dennis Setterington (17 November 1945 – 13 December 2005) was a Scottish footballer, who played for Rangers, Falkirk and Stirling Albion.

Setterington, who was a Scottish schoolboy international, signed for Rangers immediately after leaving school. He spent eight years with Rangers, ⁣ref name = "falkirk"/> but was unable to hold down a regular first team place. He was transferred to Falkirk in 1970 for £10,000 and was replaced in the Rangers squad by Derek Johnstone.

References

External links

1945 births
2005 deaths
Scottish footballers
Association football midfielders
Rangers F.C. players
Falkirk F.C. players
Stirling Albion F.C. players
Scottish Football League players